Loudermilk may refer to:

People
Barry Loudermilk (born 1963), American politician
Isaiahh Loudermilk (born 1997), American football player
John D. Loudermilk (1934–2016), American singer-songwriter

Other uses
Loudermilk (TV series), American comedy television series starring Ron Livingston
Gosling (band), American rock band earlier known as "Loudermilk"
Loudermilk is a book by Lucy Ives

See also
Lowdermilk (disambiguation)